William Hornby may refer to:

William Hornby (governor) (1723–1803), Governor of Bombay, 1771–1784
William Henry Hornby (1805–1884), British industrialist, Member of Parliament (MP) for Blackburn 1857–1869
Sir William Hornby, 1st Baronet (1841–1928), his son, British MP for Blackburn, 1886–1910
William Hornby (Warrington MP), British Member of Parliament for Warrington
William Hornby (priest) (1848–1932), Archdeacon of Lancaster, 1870–1895